This is a list of the extreme points of Central America, the points that are farther north, south, east, or west than any other location on the region. The list also included highest and lowest points and identifies the most extensive lake.

Extreme points 
Northernmost point – Mexico–Belize border with Juan Sarabia
Northernmost town – Corozal Town, Belize
Southernmost point (mainland) – Punta Mariato, Panama
Southernmost point – Cocos Island, Costa Rica
Southernmost town – El Cacao, Panama
Easternmost point – North America-South America border near Unguía, Colombia
Easternmost town – Chepigana, Panama
Westernmost point – Mouth of the Suchiate River, border with Mexico.
Westernmost town – Malacatán, Guatemala

Highest points
Volcán Tajumulco, San Marcos, Guatemala  — highest summit of Central America at 4220 m (13,845 feet)

Lowest points
Isthmus of Rivas, Rivas, Nicaragua  — lowest pass between Caribbean Sea and Pacific Ocean on the Continental Divide of the Americas at 56 m (184 feet)
Caribbean shoreline — lowest surface point at sea level

Lakes
Lake Nicaragua, Nicaragua  — most extensive lake at 8,264 km2 (3,191 square miles)

See also
Geography of Central America
Extreme points of the Earth
Extreme points of the Americas
Extreme points of North America
Extreme points of Canada
Extreme points of Canadian provinces
Extreme communities of Canada
Extreme points of Greenland
Extreme points of Mexico
Extreme points of the United States
Extreme points of U.S. states
Extreme points of Massachusetts
Extreme Points of Texas
Extreme points of New England
Extreme points of Central America
Extreme points of the Caribbean
Extreme points of Cuba
Extreme points of South America
Extreme points of Argentina
Extreme points of Brazil
Extreme points of Chile
Extreme points of Colombia
Extreme points of Peru

Notes

References

External links

Geography of Central America
Central America
Central America